East Porterville is an unincorporated community in Tulare County, California, United States. Adjacent to the city of Porterville, the community lies by the Sierra Nevada foothills. The population was 7,331 at the 2010 census, up from 6,730 at the 2000 census. For statistical purposes, the United States Census Bureau has defined East Porterville as a census-designated place (CDP). The census definition of the area may not precisely correspond to local understanding of the area with the same name.

Geography
East Porterville is located at  (36.056101, -118.983836).

Demographics

2010
The 2010 United States Census reported that East Porterville had a population of 7,331. The racial makeup of East Porterville was 3,660 (54.1%) White, 65 (1.0%) African American, 153 (2.3%) Native American, 102 (1.5%) Asian, 58 (0.9%) Pacific Islander, 2,431 (35.9%) from other races, and 298 (4.4%) from two or more races. Hispanic or Latino of any race were 4,930 persons (72.9%).

The Census reported that 6,760 people (99.9% of the population) lived in households, 7 (0.1%) lived in non-institutionalized group quarters, and 0 (0%) were institutionalized.

There were 1,637 households, out of which 993 (60.7%) had children under the age of 18 living in them, 884 (54.0%) were opposite-sex married couples living together, 325 (19.9%) had a female householder with no husband present, 179 (10.9%) had a male householder with no wife present.  There were 173 (10.6%) unmarried opposite-sex partnerships, and 9 (0.5%) same-sex married couples or partnerships. 173 households (10.6%) were made up of individuals, and 61 (3.7%) had someone living alone who was 65 years of age or older. The average household size was 4.13.  There were 1,388 families (84.8% of all households); the average family size was 4.36.

The population was spread out, with 2,476 people (36.6%) under the age of 18, 858 people (12.7%) aged 18 to 24, 1,683 people (24.9%) aged 25 to 44, 1,326 people (19.6%) aged 45 to 64, and 424 people (6.3%) who were 65 years of age or older.  The median age was 25.4 years. For every 100 females, there were 106.0 males.  For every 100 females age 18 and over, there were 108.1 males.

The homeowner vacancy rate was 1.3%; the rental vacancy rate was 4.7%.  3,072 people (45.4% of the population) lived in owner-occupied housing units and 3,688 people (54.5%) lived in rental housing units.

2000
As of the census of 2000, there were 6,730 people, 1,709 households, and 1,413 families residing in the CDP. The racial makeup of the CDP was 45.79% White, 0.68% African American, 2.79% Native American, 2.66% Asian, 0.39% Pacific Islander, 43.12% from other races, and 4.56% from two or more races. Hispanic or Latino of any race were 64.14% of the population.

There were 1,709 households, out of which 50.6% had children under the age of 18 living with them, 53.2% were married couples living together, 19.6% had a female householder with no husband present, and 17.3% were non-families. 12.3% of all households were made up of individuals, and 5.6% had someone living alone who was 65 years of age or older. The average household size was 3.93 and the average family size was 4.20.

In the CDP, the population was spread out, with 37.9% under the age of 18, 13.0% from 18 to 24, 27.2% from 25 to 44, 14.8% from 45 to 64, and 7.1% who were 65 years of age or older. The median age was 24 years. For every 100 females, there were 106.2 males. For every 100 females age 18 and over, there were 105.9 males.

The median income for a household in the CDP was $25,022, and the median income for a family was $25,481. Males had a median income of $19,004 versus $18,854 for females. The per capita income for the CDP was $9,475. About 33.2% of families and 38.6% of the population were below the poverty line, including 49.3% of those under age 18 and 18.9% of those age 65 or over.

Infrastructure

In August 2014 during 2012–14 North American drought, East Porterville was experiencing "Exceptional" drought conditions, as was the entirety of Tulare County. The Fresno Bee reported that close to 1000 homes were without water due to a declining water table and dependence on shallow wells. Although scores of people had been calling public agencies such as the county, the next-door city of Porterville, and the local water district to report dry wells, authorities have not realized the extent of the problem since the agencies did not track private wells.

Government

In the United States House of Representatives, East Porterville is in

References

Census-designated places in Tulare County, California
Census-designated places in California